Greim, at , is a mountain in the Wölzer Tauern, part of the Niedere Tauern, in Styria, Austria.
After the Rettelkirchspitze, it is the second highest elevation of the Wölzer Tauern.

The ascent is relatively easy, especially from the south side. Starting at the Greimhütte , the top can be reached in 2 hours on a marked trail.

The Greimhütte can be reached by car from Sankt Peter am Kammersberg.

References

Mountains of Styria
Mountains of the Alps
Rottenmann and Wölz Tauern